Ablabesmyia pectinata is a species of fly described by Botnariuc 1953. No sub-species mentioned in Catalogue of Life.

References

Tanypodinae
Insects described in 1953